Gunnar Berge (born 29 August 1940) is a Norwegian politician for the Labour Party, born in Etne, Hordaland. Berge represented Rogaland in the Norwegian Parliament from 1969 to 1993. He was Minister of Finance 1986–1989, Minister of Local Government and Regional Development 1992–1996, as well as minister of Nordic Cooperation 1992–1996. After his political career he was Director General of the Norwegian Petroleum Directorate 1996–2007. He was also member of the Norwegian Nobel Committee from 1997 to 2002, as leader from 2000 to 2002.

References

1940 births
Living people
Ministers of Finance of Norway
Ministers of Local Government and Modernisation of Norway
Directors of government agencies of Norway
Members of the Storting
Chairpersons of the Norwegian Nobel Committee
Labour Party (Norway) politicians
20th-century Norwegian politicians
People from Etne